Krisztián Szabó (born 19 June 1974) is a Hungarian short track speed skater. He competed in the men's 500 metres event at the 2002 Winter Olympics.

References

1974 births
Living people
Hungarian male short track speed skaters
Olympic short track speed skaters of Hungary
Short track speed skaters at the 2002 Winter Olympics
Sportspeople from Debrecen